Jane Elisabeth Brophy (born 27 August 1963) is a British politician who was a Liberal Democrats Member of the European Parliament (MEP) for the North West England between 2019 and the United Kingdom's withdrawal from the EU on 31 January 2020. She sat as a full member on the Committee on Employment and Social Affairs and the Delegation for relations with the Federative Republic of Brazil. Brophy also sat as a substitute member on the Committee on the Environment, Public Health and Food Safety and Delegation for relations with Afghanistan.

She is a councillor and Liberal Democrat Deputy Group Leader on Trafford Council and was the Liberal Democrat candidate in the 2017 Greater Manchester mayoral election, coming third with 6% of the vote. She is a member of the executive of Green Liberal Democrats. She stood as a Liberal Democrat in parliamentary elections for Eccles in 2005, Altrincham and Sale West in 2010, 2015 and 2017, and a by-election in Oldham West and Royton in 2015.

Brophy is a dietician who specialises in the management of diabetes, and she has worked for the National Health Service (NHS). She is a member of the British Dietetic Association board. She has a degree in biochemistry.

References

External links

Profile at European Parliament
Profile at Liberal Democrats

1963 births
Living people
MEPs for England 2019–2020
21st-century women MEPs for England
Liberal Democrats (UK) MEPs
Councillors in Trafford
Liberal Democrats (UK) parliamentary candidates
Dietitians
Liberal Democrats (UK) councillors
Women councillors in England